Notak , is a town and Union Council of Bhakkar District in the Punjab province of Pakistan.

References
<li value="1"> Tehsils & Unions in the District of Bhakkar - Government of Pakistan

Union councils of Bhakkar District